Saint-Vérain is a commune in the Nièvre department in central France, in the historical region of Puisaye.

See also
Communes of the Nièvre department

References

Communes of Nièvre